Jamont Gordon (born March 16, 1987) is an American former professional basketball player. He played for the Mississippi State Bulldogs. At Glencliff Comprehensive High School, Gordon was named 2004 TSSAA class 3A Mr. Basketball. He plays the point guard and shooting guard positions.

High school career
Jamont was heavily recruited coming out of high school, being rated as high as 16th in the nation by Rivals.com  He was named a second-team Parade All-American while at the basketball elite Oak Hill Academy in Mouth of Wilson, Virginia  after previously attending Glencliff Complex High School in Nashville, Tennessee.  Jamont's college decision came down to the University of Tennessee and Mississippi State University.

College career
In his freshman season, he paced the Mississippi State Bulldogs in both scoring (13.8 ppg) and assists (4.3 apg).  In addition to being a Freshman All-American by various publications, he was also a unanimous All-SEC Freshman selection in 2006.

As a sophomore, Jamont became the starting point forward and led the team in scoring (16.0 ppg), rebounding (7.1 rpg) and assists (5.3).  He was named to the AP All-SEC second team as well as the Coaches ALL-SEC first team.

After his sophomore season, Jamont declared for the 2007 NBA Draft only to withdraw a week later.  He was projected as an early second-round draft pick for the 2008 NBA Draft.
Gordon is unusually large for a point guard, standing 6 feet 4 inches, and weighing 225 lbs. His muscular build allows him to grab many more rebounds than the average point guard.

Professional career
In 2008, he decided to forgo his senior season at MSU to enter the 2008 NBA draft.

On June 26, 2008, Gordon was not selected in the NBA draft. He joined the Philadelphia 76ers summer league team and hired Mike Conley, Sr. as his agent.

After his brief stint in the NBA, Gordon spent time playing for Fortitudo Bologna of the Italian League and KK Cibona of the Croatian Basketball League.

On July 19, 2010, he signed a three-year contract with CSKA Moscow.

In July 2012, he signed a two-year contract with Galatasaray Medical Park.

On January 22, 2015, he signed with Tofaş for the rest of the season.

On January 20, 2017, Gordon signed with Serbian club Partizan Belgrade for the rest of the season.

Career statistics

Euroleague

|-
| style="text-align:left;"| 2009–10
| style="text-align:left;"| Cibona
| 15 || 14 || 30.4 || .431 || .314 || .731 || 4.9 || 3.8 || 1.8 || .9 || 13.9 || 16.1
|-
| style="text-align:left;"| 2010–11
| style="text-align:left;" rowspan=2| CSKA Moscow
| 10 || 6 || 26.8 || .480 || .212 || .684 || 4.8 || 3.7 || .9 || .6 || 13.1 || 15.9
|-
| style="text-align:left;"| 2011–12
| 21 || 5 || 17.9 || .446 || .348 || .773 || 1.9 || 2.0 || .8 || .2 || 6.7 || 5.8
|-
| style="text-align:left;"| 2013–14
| style="text-align:left;"| Galatasaray
| 4 || 4 || 34.2 || .341 || .389 || .909 || 4.3 || 4.5 || .8 || .0 || 11.3 || 14.0
|- class="sortbottom"
| style="text-align:left;"| Career
| style="text-align:left;"|
| 50 || 29 || 24.7 || .439 || .311 || .739 || 3.6 || 3.1 || 1.1 || .5 || 10.5 || 11.6

References

External links

 Jamont Gordon at draftexpress.com
 Jamont Gordon at eurobasket.com
 Jamont Gordon at euroleague.net
 Jamont Gordon at tblstat.net

1987 births
Living people
ABA League players
American expatriate basketball people in Croatia
American expatriate basketball people in Italy
American expatriate basketball people in Russia
American expatriate basketball people in Serbia
American expatriate basketball people in Turkey
Basketball players from Nashville, Tennessee
Fortitudo Pallacanestro Bologna players
Galatasaray S.K. (men's basketball) players
KK Cibona players
KK Partizan players
Mississippi State Bulldogs men's basketball players
Parade High School All-Americans (boys' basketball)
PBC CSKA Moscow players
Tofaş S.K. players
American men's basketball players
Guards (basketball)
Oak Hill Academy (Mouth of Wilson, Virginia) alumni